Shreyansh Jaiswal (born 27 October 1995) is an Indian male badminton player.

Achievements

BWF International Challenge/Series (1 title, 1 runner-up)
Men's singles

 BWF International Challenge tournament
 BWF International Series tournament
 BWF Future Series tournament

References 
https://www.pbl-india.com/players/1215-shreyansh-jaiswal-playerprofile

External links 
 

Living people
1995 births
Indian male badminton players